Derreen Ada Lucy Good (born 1904-) was an Irish badminton player.

Biography
Derreen Good was the daughter of badminton players Dr T. D. Good and Ada Good. Two of her siblings also played badminton at national and international level, Barbara and Norman. Good played her first international badminton match in 1928.

Achievements

References

1904 births
Date of death unknown
Irish female badminton players